Set operation may have one of the following meanings.

 Any operation with sets
 Set operation (Boolean), Boolean set operations in the algebra of sets
 Set operations (SQL) 
 Fuzzy set operations

See also 
 Set (disambiguation)